The Yuraqmayu (Quechua yuraq white, mayu river, "white river", hispaniciced spelling Yuracmayo) or Río Blanco (Spanish for "white river") is a 36.2 km long river in Peru located in the Lima Region, Huarochirí Province, in the districts of Chicla and San Mateo. It is a left tributary of the Rimac River which empties into the Pacific Ocean.

The river originates in the San Mateo District, southeast of Kunkus Yantaq. Its direction is mainly to the northwest. Upstream it is the natural border between the districts of Chicla and San Mateo. The confluence with the Rimac River is south of Chicla.

It is operated by Edegel.

References

Rivers of Peru
Rivers of Lima Region
Dams in Peru
Buildings and structures in Lima Region